Social Democrats, USA (SDUSA) is a minor social-democratic organization established in 1972 as the successor of the Socialist Party of America (SPA). The SPA had stopped running independent presidential candidates and consequently the term "party" in its name had confused the public. Moreover, replacing the "socialist" label with "social democrats" was meant to disassociate the group from the Soviet Union.

SDUSA, which was fiercely anti-communist, pursued a strategy of political realignment intended to organize labor unions, civil rights organizations and other constituencies into a coalition that would transform the Democratic Party into a social-democratic party. The realignment strategy emphasized working with unions and especially the AFL–CIO, putting an emphasis on economic issues that would unite working class voters. SDUSA opposed the so-called senator George McGovern's New Leftist approach, pointing to the rout suffered in the 1972 presidential election. As a result, some SDUSA members, like Penn Kemble and Joshua Muravchik, were associated with neoconservatism. SDUSA's activities have included sponsoring discussions and issuing position papers. SDUSA has included civil rights activists and leaders of labor unions such as Bayard Rustin, Norman Hill and Tom Kahn of the AFL–CIO as well as Sandra Feldman and Rachelle Horowitz of the American Federation of Teachers (AFT). Internationally, the group supported the dissident Polish labor organization Solidarity and several anti-communist political movements in global hot spots.

SDUSA's politics were criticized by former SPA chairman Michael Harrington, who in 1972 announced that he favored an immediate pull-out of American forces from Vietnam and coined the term "neoconservative". After losing all votes at the 1972 convention that changed the SPA to SDUSA, Harrington resigned in 1973 to form the Democratic Socialist Organizing Committee, the forerunner of the Democratic Socialists of America.

Socialist Party of America 

By the early 1970s, the Socialist Party of America (SPA) was publicly associated with A. Philip Randolph, the civil rights and labor union leader; and with Michael Harrington, the author of The Other America. Even before the 1972 convention, Harrington had resigned as an Honorary Chairperson of the SPA "because he was upset about the group’s failure to enthusiastically support George McGovern and because of its views on the Vietnam War".

In its 1972 Convention, the SPA had two Co-Chairmen, Bayard Rustin and Charles S. Zimmerman of the International Ladies' Garment Workers' Union (ILGWU); and a First National Vice Chairman, James S. Glaser, who were re-elected by acclamation. In his opening speech to the Convention, Co-Chairman Bayard Rustin called for SDUSA to organize against the "reactionary policies of the Nixon Administration" and Rustin also criticized the "irresponsibility and élitism of the 'New Politics' liberals".

The party changed its name to Social Democrats, USA, by a vote of 73 to 34. Changing the name of the Socialist Party of America to Social Democrats, USA, was intended to be "realistic" as the intention was to respond to the end of the running of actual SPA candidates for office and to respond to the confusions of Americans. The New York Times observed that the Socialist Party had last sponsored Darlington Hoopes as candidate for President in 1956 and who received only 2,121 votes, which were cast in only six states. Because the SPA no longer sponsored party candidates in elections, continued use of the name "party" was "misleading" and hindered the recruiting of activists who participated in the Democratic Party according to the majority report. The name "Socialist" was replaced by "Social Democrats" because many American associated the term "socialism" with Marxism–Leninism. Moreover, the organization sought to distinguish itself from two small Marxist parties, the Socialist Workers Party and the Socialist Labor Party.

During the 1972 Convention, the majority (Unity Caucus) won every vote by a ratio of two to one. The Convention elected a national committee of 33 members, with 22 seats for the majority caucus, eight seats for the Coalition Caucus of Harrington, two for the left-wing Debs Caucus and one for the independent Samuel H. Friedman. Friedman and the minority caucuses had opposed the name change.

The convention voted on and adopted proposals for its program by a two-one vote. On foreign policy, the program called for "firmness toward Communist aggression". However, on the Vietnam War the program opposed "any efforts to bomb Hanoi into submission" and instead it endorsed negotiating a peace agreement, which should protect communist political cadres in South Vietnam from further military or police reprisals. Harrington's proposal for a ceasefire and immediate withdrawal of American forces was defeated. Harrington complained that after its convention the SPA had endorsed George McGovern only with a statement loaded with "constructive criticism" and that it had not mobilized enough support for McGovern. The majority caucus's Arch Puddington replied that the California branch was especially active in supporting McGovern while the New York branch were focusing on a congressional race.

When the SPA changed its name to SDUSA, Bayard Rustin became its public spokesman. According to Rustin, SDUSA aimed to transform the Democratic Party into a social democratic party. A strategy of re-alignment was particularly associated with Max Shachtman.

Some months after the convention, Harrington resigned his membership in SDUSA and he and some of his supporters from the Coalition Caucus soon formed the Democratic Socialist Organizing Committee (DSOC). Many members of the Debs Caucus resigned from SDUSA and some of them formed the Socialist Party USA. The changing of the name of the SPA to SDUSA and the 1973 formation of DSOC and the SPUSA represented a split in the American socialist movement.

Early years 

In domestic politics, the SDUSA leadership emphasized the role of the American labor movement in advancing civil rights and economic justice. The domestic program followed the recommendations of Rustin's article "From Protest to Politics" in which Rustin analyzed the changing economy and its implications for African Americans. Rustin wrote that the rise of automation would reduce the demand for low-skill high-paying jobs, which would jeopardize the position of the urban black working class, particularly in the Northern United States. The needs of the black community demanded a shift in political strategy, where blacks would need to strengthen their political alliance with mostly white unions and other organizations (churches, synagogues and the like) to pursue a common economic agenda. It was time to move from protest to politics, wrote Rustin. A particular danger facing the black community was the chimera of identity politics, particularly the rise of Black Power which Rustin dismissed as a fantasy of middle-class African-Americans that repeated the political and moral errors of previous black nationalists while alienating the white allies needed by the black community.

SDUSA documents had similar criticisms of the agendas advanced by middle class activists increasing their role in the Democratic Party. SDUSA members stated concerns about an exaggerated role of middle-class peace activists in the Democratic Party, particularly associated with the "New Politics" of Senator George McGovern, whose presidential candidacy was viewed as an ongoing disaster for the Democratic Party and for the United States. In electoral politics, SDUSA aimed to transform the Democratic Party into a social democratic party.

In foreign policy, most of the founding SDUSA leadership called for an immediate cessation of the bombing of North Vietnam. They demanded a negotiated peace treaty to end the Vietnam War, but the majority opposed a unilateral withdrawal of American forces from Vietnam, suggesting that such a withdrawal would lead to an annihilation of the free labor unions and of the political opposition. After the withdrawal of American forces from Vietnam and the victory of the Communist Party of Vietnam and the Viet Cong, SDUSA supported humanitarian assistance to refugees and condemned Senator McGovern for his failure to support such assistance.

Organizational activities 

SDUSA was governed by biannual conventions which invited the participation of interested observers. These gatherings featured discussions and debates over proposed resolutions, some of which were adopted as organizational statements. The group frequently made use of outside speakers at these events: non-SDUSA intellectuals ranged from neoconservatives like Jeane Kirkpatrick on the right to democratic socialists like Paul Berman on the left and similarly a range of academic, political and labor-union leaders were invited. These meetings also functioned as reunions for political activists and intellectuals, some of whom worked together for decades. SDUSA also published a newsletter and occasional position papers, issued statements supporting labor unions and workers' interests at home and overseas, the existence of Israel and the Israeli labor movement. From 1979–1989, SDUSA members were organized to support of Solidarity, the independent labor union of Poland.

The organization also attempted to exert influence through endorsements of presidential candidates. The group's 1976 National Convention, held in New York City, formally endorsed the Democratic ticket of Jimmy Carter and Walter Mondale and pledged the group to "work enthusiastically" for the election of the pair in November. The organization took a less assertive approach during the divisive 1980 campaign, marked as it was by a heated primary challenge to President Carter by Senator Edward Kennedy and SDUSA chose not to hold its biannual convention until after the termination of the fall campaign. The election of conservative Ronald Reagan was chalked up to the failure of the Democrats to "appeal to their traditional working class constituency".

Early in 1980, long-time National Director Carl Gershman resigned his position to be replaced by Rita Freedman. Freedman previously had served as organizer and chair of SDUSA's key New York local.

SDUSA dues were paid annually in advance, with members receiving a copy of the organization's official organ, the tabloid-sized newspaper New America. The dues rate was $25 per year in 1983.

Hiatus and re-foundation 
Following the death of the organization's Notesonline editor Penn Kemble of cancer on October 15, 2005, SDUSA lapsed into a state of organizational hiatus, with no further issues of the online newsletter produced or updates to the group's website made.

Following several years of inactivity, an attempt was subsequently made to revive SDUSA. In 2008, a group composed initially mostly of Pennsylvania members of SDUSA emerged, determined to re-launch the organization. A re-founding convention of the SDUSA was held May 3, 2009, at which a National Executive Committee was elected.

Owing to factional disagreements, a group based in Johnstown, Pennsylvania, and the newly elected National Executive Committee parted company, with the former styling itself as the Social Democrats, USA – Socialist Party USA and the latter as Social Democrats, USA.

Two additional conventions took place since the 2009 reformation, an internet teleconference on September 1, 2010, featuring presentations by guest speakers Herb Engstrom of the California Democratic Party Executive Committee and Roger Clayman, Executive Director of the Long Island Labor Federation; and a convention held August 26–27, 2012, in Buffalo, New York, with a keynote address delivered by Richard Lipsitz, executive director of Western New York Labor Federation.

Controversies

Anti-communism 

Michael Harrington charged that its "obsessive anti-communism" rendered SDUSA politically conservative. In contrast, Harrington's DSOC and DSA criticized Marxism–Leninism, but he opposed many defense-and-diplomatic policies against the Soviet Union and its Eastern Bloc. Harrington voiced admiration for German Chancellor Willy Brandt's Ostpolitik which sought to reduce Western distrust of and hostility towards the Eastern Bloc and so entice the Soviet Union reciprocally to reduce its aggressive military posture.

Max Shachtman and alleged Trotskyism 
SDUSA leaders have served in the administrations of Presidents since the 1980 and the service of some members in Republican administrations has been associated with controversy. This "Trotskyist" charge has been repeated and even widened by journalist Michael Lind in 2003 to assert a takeover of the foreign policy of the George W. Bush administration by former Trotskyists. Lind's "amalgamation of the defense intellectuals with the traditions and theories of "the largely Jewish-American Trotskyist movement [in Lind's words]" was criticized in 2003 by University of Michigan professor Alan M. Wald, who had discussed Trotskyism  in his history of "the New York intellectuals". SDUSA and allegations that "Trotskyists" subverted Bush's foreign policy have been  mentioned by "self-styled" paleoconservatives (conservative opponents of neoconservatism).

Harrington and Tom Kahn had been associated with Max Shachtman, a Marxist theorist who had broken with Leon Trotsky because of his criticism of the Soviet Union as being a totalitarian class-society after having supported Trotsky in the 1930s. Although Schachtman died in 1972 before the Socialist Party was renamed as SDUSA, Shachtman's ideas continued to influence the Albert Shanker and The American Federation of Teachers, which was often associated with SDUSA members. Decades later, conflicts in the AFL–CIO were roughly split in 1995 along the lines of the conflict between the "Shachtmanite Social Democrats and the Harringtonite Democratic Socialists of America, with the Social Democrats supporting Kirkland and Donahue and the Democratic Socialists supporting Sweeney".

Alleged conservatism or neoconservatism 

Author Justin Vaisse considers some SDUSA members "right-wing social democrats", a taunt according to Wattenberg.

SDUSA members supported Solidarity, the independent labor-union of Poland. The organizer of the AFL–CIO's support for Solidarity, SDUSA's Tom Kahn, criticized Jeane Kirkpatrick's "Dictatorships and Double Standards", arguing that democracy should be promoted even in the countries dominated by Soviet Communism. In 1981, leading Social Democrats and some moderate Republicans wanted to use economic aid to Poland as leverage to expand the freedom of association in 1981, whereas Caspar Weinberger and neoconservative Jeane Kirkpatrick preferred to force the communist government of Poland to default on its international payments so they would lose credibility. Kahn argued for his position in a 1981 debate with neoconservative Norman Podhoretz, who like Kirkpatrick and Weinberger opposed all credits. In 1982, Kirkpatrick called similarly for Western assistance to Poland to be used to help Solidarity.

The Washington Post, then owned by Graham Holdings,  had called some of SDUSA's former members neoconservatives. Justin Vaisse listed five SDUSA associates as "second-generation neoconservatives" and "so-called Shachtmanites", including "Penn Kemble, Joshua Muravchik,... and Bayard Rustin". Throughout his life, Penn Kemble called himself a social democrat and objected to being called a neoconservative. Kemble and Joshua Muravchik were never followers of Max Shachtman. On the contrary, Kemble was recruited by a non-Shachtmanite professor, according to Muravchik, who wrote: "Although Shachtman was one of the elder statesmen who occasionally made stirring speeches to us, no YPSL [Young People's Socialist League] of my generation was a Shachtmanite". Besides objecting to being called a "neoconservative", Kemble "sharply criticized the Bush administration's approach on [Iraq]. 'The distinction between liberation and democratization, which requires a strategy and instruments, was an idea never understood by the administration,' he told the New Republic", wrote The Washington Post in Kemble's obituary.

Former member Joshua Muravchik 
Joshua Muravchik has identified himself as a neoconservative. When Muravhchik appeared at the 2003 SDUSA conference, he was criticized by SDUSA members: Rachelle Horowitz, another Social Democrats, USA, luminary and an event organizer, called Muravchik's comments "profoundly disturbing"—both his use of "us and them" rhetoric and the term "evil." The existence of evil in the world was something Horowitz was happy to concede, she said from the floor. But it was a word incapable of clear political definition and thus a producer of muddle rather than clarity, zeal rather than political action. Then Herf jumped in with similar criticisms. And then Berman. And Ibrahim. And before long, more or less everyone else in the room. There was still something, it seemed, that separated them from the neocons who hovered over the proceedings both as opponents and inspirations. Muravchik wanted to pull them somewhere most of the attendees—and organizers—were unwilling to go. Among Joshua Muravchick's SDUSA critics was his own father Emanuel Muravchik (a Norman Thomas socialist). His mother was too upset with Joshua's Heaven on Earth: The Rise and Fall of Socialism to attend the discussion. On the other hand, Joshua Muravchik was called a "second-generation neoconservative" by Vaisse.

Conventions

After reorganization

Prominent members 

 Robert J. Alexander
 Paul Feldman
 Sandra Feldman
 Carl Gershman
 Albert Glotzer
 Norman Hill
 Sidney Hook
 Tom Kahn
 Penn Kemble
 A. Philip Randolph
 Bayard Rustin
 August Tyler
 Charles S. Zimmerman

Notes

References 
 
 
  Revised and incorporated in

Publications 
  "The following program was adopted at the Social Democrats, U.S.A. and Young People's Socialist League conventions at the end of December, 1972".
 .
 
 Bayard Rustin and Carl Gershman, Africa, Soviet imperialism and the retreat of American power. New York: Social Democrats, USA, 1978. (SD papers #2).
 
 Carl Gershman The world according to Andrew Young. New York: Social Democrats, USA, 1978. (SD papers #4).
 Leszek Kołakowski and Sidney Hook, The social democratic challenge. New York: Social Democrats, USA, 1978. (SD papers #5).
 Carl Gershman, Selling them the rope: Business and the Soviets. New York: Social Democrats, USA, 1979. (SD papers #6).
 Lane Kirkland and Rita Freedman, Building on the past for the future. New York: Social Democrats, USA, 1981.
 Social Democrats, USA: Standard bearers for freedom, democracy, and economic justice. New York: Social Democrats, USA, n.d. [1980s].
 A challenge to the Democratic Party. New York: Social Democrats, USA, 1983.
 Alfonso Robelo, The Nicaraguan democratic struggle: Our unfinished revolution. New York: Social Democrats, USA, 1983. (SD papers #8).
 Scabs renamed, permanent replacements.  New York: Social Democrats, USA, 1990.
 On foreign policy and defense. Washington, D.C. : Social Democrats, USA, 1990.
 SD, USA statement on the economy. New York: Social Democrats, USA, 1991.
 Child labor, US style. New York: Social Democrats, USA, 1991.
 Child labor, an international abuse. New York: Social Democrats, USA, 1991.
 John T. Joyce, Expanding economic democracy. New York: Social Democrats, USA, 1991.
 Rita Freedman, Does America need a social democratic movement? Washington, DC: Social Democrats, USA, 1993.
 Why America needs a social democratic movement. Washington, DC : Social Democrats, USA, 1993.
 The future of socialism. San Jose, CA: San Francisco Bay Area Local of Social Democrats, USA, 1994.

Further reading 
 .
 
 .

External links 

 "Preliminary Inventory of the Social Democrats, USA Records, 1937–1994". Rubenstein Rare Book and Manuscript Library. Duke University. Durham, North Carolina.
 Dale Reed (1999). "Register of the Carl Gershman Papers" (PDF). Hoover Institution Archives. Stanford University. Stanford, California.
 Dale Reed (2010). "Register of the Albert Glotzer Papers" (PDF). Hoover Institution Archives. Stanford University, Stanford, California.
 "News and Opinion from Social Democrats USA".

 
Factions in the Democratic Party (United States)